The mission of the Multiple Myeloma Research Consortium (MMRC) is to champion collaboration with and integration across academia and industry and to focus on speed and innovation to bring the most promising multiple myeloma treatments to patients faster. It was founded by Kathy Giusti, a myeloma patient and founder and chief executive officer of the Multiple Myeloma Research Foundation (MMRF).

MMRC model
The MMRC comprises 14 member institutions nationwide that form its clinical trials network. It is led by an executive committee in Norwalk, Connecticut, and a steering committee and progress review committee composed of researchers from MMRC Member Institutions. The MMRC also includes a shared tissue bank of annotated tissue and peripheral blood samples from multiple myeloma patients.

MMRC member institutions
The MMRC currently comprises fourteen world-renowned academic institutions:
 Dana–Farber Cancer Institute
 H. Lee Moffitt Cancer Center & Research Institute
 Mayo Clinic
 City of Hope National Medical Center
 Emory University, Indiana University
 Hackensack University Medical Center
 Ohio State University Comprehensive Cancer Center
 Saint Vincent Catholic Medical Center
 University Health Network (Princess Margaret Cancer Centre)
 University of California, San Francisco Medical Center
 University of Chicago
 University of Michigan Rogel Cancer Center
 Alvin J. Siteman Cancer Center at Barnes-Jewish Hospital
 Washington University School of Medicine.

MMRC Tissue Bank
The MMRC Tissue Bank serves as a “bridge” between laboratory and clinical research conducted by the MMRC and is a resource to advance the MMRC Multiple Myeloma Genomics Initiative.

MMRC clinical trials
The MMRC is focused on advancing Phase I and Phase II clinical trials of novel compounds and combination approaches. To date, the MMRC has opened through its clinical trials network 22 clinical trials with industry partners – including Novartis, Celgene, Merck, and Proteolix. MMRC clinical trials are also designed to include correlative studies to better understand what drugs are most effective in treating various sub-groups of patients with myeloma, laying the foundation for the development of personalized medicine.

MMRC Multiple Myeloma Genomics Initiative
The MMRC Multiple Myeloma Genomics Initiative comprehensive genomic analysis program. It was designed to rapidly accelerate progress made against multiple myeloma by significantly improving the understanding of the biology of the disease. It is spearheaded by the MMRC and in collaboration with the Broad Institute and the Translational Genomics Research Institute (TGen).

See also
 Multiple Myeloma Research Foundation

References

External links
 Multiple Myeloma Research Consortium
 Wall Street Journal Article on the MMRC
 MMRC Featured on NBC Nightly News

Cancer organizations based in the United States
Norwalk, Connecticut
Clinical trial organizations
Medical and health organizations based in Connecticut